PT4 or variant may refer to:
 New Horizons PT4, aka 2014 MT69, a celestial object.
 PT-4, a pre-World War II US Navy PT-boat.
 Prison Tycoon 4: Supermax (2008 videogame)
 PT4, a paratriathlon classification.